Rudolf Kolak (4 November 1918 – 22 December 2004) was a Yugoslav and Bosnian communist politician.

Biography
Kolak was born in Gornji Ribnik near Ključ to a Bosnian Croat family. He studied at the University of Belgrade's Law School until 1940. Kolak joined the Communist Party of Yugoslavia in 1941, joining the Partisans. Later he became a member of the Central Committee of the Communist Party of Yugoslavia.

After the war, Kolak held various posts: he was Secretary of the People's Assembly of Socialist Republic of Bosnia and Herzegovina, President of People's Assembly in Banja Luka, President of the Supervisory Committee, and Minister in the Government of the Socialist Republic of Bosnia and Herzegovina. 

After that he was spokesman in the Ministry of Finance of the Government of SFR Yugoslavia and spokesman of the President of Yugoslavia, Josip Broz Tito. 

From 1963-65 he was Vice President of the Executive Council of SR Bosnia and Herzegovina and became President of the Executive Council of SR Bosnia and Herzegovina in 1965 and held that post until 1967.

After that he was Vice President of the Federal Government of SFR Yugoslavia from 1967-69 and President of the Yugoslav Chamber of Commerce from 1969-74.

References

Notes

Books 

 

Prime Ministers of Bosnia and Herzegovina
1918 births
2004 deaths
Yugoslav politicians
Bosnia and Herzegovina atheists
Bosnia and Herzegovina politicians
Yugoslav Partisans members
Croatian politicians
Croats of Bosnia and Herzegovina
League of Communists of Bosnia and Herzegovina politicians
University of Belgrade Faculty of Law alumni
Bosnia and Herzegovina people of World War II
Central Committee of the League of Communists of Yugoslavia members
Recipients of the Order of the Hero of Socialist Labour